is located on the border of the cities of Takayama and Gero in Gifu Prefecture, Japan. The mountain also separates the watersheds of the northern and southern portions of the Hida region. The Jinzū River flows to the north and the Hida River flows to the south.

References

Kurai, Mount